Kowale Oleckie  (from 1938-45 Reimannswalde)  is a village in Olecko County, Warmian-Masurian Voivodeship, in northern Poland. It is the seat of the gmina (administrative district) called Gmina Kowale Oleckie.

The village has a population of 2,400.

References

Kowale Oleckie